Xaverian College is a Roman Catholic college in Manchester, England,  south of the city centre in Rusholme. Established in 1862, Xaverian College has become one of the most oversubscribed Sixth form college in Greater Manchester, along with Loreto College and  Ashton Sixth Form College. It consistently ranks in the top 10 facilities for 16-18 education. Xaverian College is a member of the Association of Colleges. As of 2019, the acceptance rate is 30%.

It is near the University of Manchester and the Royal Northern College of Music. As it is in partnership with the University of Manchester, Xaverian houses the foundational courses of Sciences on behalf of UoM and Xaverian College students are also able to access the University of Manchester Library.

History

1862-1976

The Xaverian Brothers, or Congregation of St Francis Xavier (CFX), are a Roman Catholic religious order founded by Theodore James Ryken in Bruges, Belgium, in 1839 and named after St. Francis Xavier. The order is dedicated to Roman Catholic education in the United Kingdom, the United States and many other countries.

 The college was founded by the Xaverian Brothers in 1862 and until 1903 was housed in a four-storey building on Oxford Road, Manchester. On the move to the then gated Victoria Park, it was originally housed in a building known as Firwood, but over time, through new building projects and acquisition, the campus grew.

Firwood was home to the Brothers until 1993 when the last of them left. Another former house which has now become part of the college, Ward Hall, was used as a camp for American servicemen in the Second World War.

Mancunian Films, a motion picture production company, used the exterior of the college in several of their films, including It's A Grand Life, starring Frank Randle and Diana Dors. The film company sold their Dickenson Road Studios to the BBC in 1954, making Dickenson Road Studios the first regional BBC TV studio. When the BBC left in 1974 to move to Oxford Road, Xaverian inherited their lighting rigs, now used in the drama studio. From 1946 to 1977, the school was a direct grant grammar school.

1977 to present
The college was a Roman Catholic grammar school for boys until 1977, when it became a mixed sixth-form college. Direct Grant Grammar School status ended and Xaverian became a Sixth Form College for young men and women aged sixteen to nineteen within the Manchester Local Education Authority. In 1993, the College Principal Mrs Quinn led an expansion in student numbers, refurbished and modernised many of the buildings and updated the curriculum with vocationally based courses and the introduction of information technology across many subjects. Her greatest success, however, was to maintain the distinctive Xaverian mission and ethos in a period of much change and uncertainty.

Capital from the Xaverian Brothers and grants from the FEFC allowed a new multi-resource building, The Ryken, to be constructed in 2002. By 2005, the FEFC had become the Learning and Skills Council and recognised the college's progress by part funding a state-of-the-art new building, which was named Mayfield. 

In 2007, Mrs Mary Hunter was made Principal. Her appointment can be seen as another watershed in the life of Xaverian. Hunter, whose previous experience was in the general FE sector, brought both an objective eye and a heart-felt empathy to a college truly committed to a special Mission. This was recognised in the latest Ofsted Inspection when the college was graded outstanding in all areas of the report. The college was subsequently awarded Beacon status.

Campus

The college consists of nine buildings on two sides of Lower Park Road: Ward Hall, Birtles, Marylands, Firwood, Xavier, Sunbury, Ryken, Mayfield, and Teresa Quinn built from 1840 onwards. Additions and renovations have been an ongoing feature of the campus's development, with Birtles a key example of this process. The Ryken and Mayfield buildings, added at the start of the 21st century, along with Teresa Quinn, opened in 2020, house information technology equipment. The Ryken building was named after one of the founders of the Xaverian order, Theodore James Ryken. The college buildings are around the perimeter of a central grassed area where sporting and social activities take place.

 Ward Hall (previously the US Embassy Northern Outpost in World War Two) has been transformed to inspire the creative success of students passionate about Art, Graphic Communication, Photography, and Textiles. It also features extensive film and media facilities, a cine room where students can organise film afternoons, and brand-new classrooms for Criminology, Classical Civilisation, Law, Sociology, and History courses. 
 Birtles Sport, Geography, Music and Drama students are housed in the new Birtles building. Built to have drama and music studios, rehearsal rooms, a recording suite and computer labs. 
 Marylands for English Language and English Literature 
 Firwood houses the main student common room, catering facilities, student services, learning support suite, additional learning support and tutorial rooms, college chapel and RE rooms, administration offices and the main reception.
 Xavier is home to the University of Manchester foundation courses in Biology, Medicine and Dentistry and also houses Mathematics and Sciences.
 Sunbury houses RE classes,  Theology and Philosophy, and the NHS cadet course, among others and Uniformed Public Services. 
 Ryken for Foundation Level 1 courses. The careers service and library. It also provides a seminar room for visiting speakers, and a large drop-in centre where students are able to make use of college ICT facilities. 
 Mayfield accommodating  Accounting, Business Studies, Computer Science, Economics,  Geography, Government and Politics, History, Mathematics, Modern Languages  ICT and Psychology (Mayfield College was a Xaverian college in East Sussex.) 
 Teresa Quinn is the newest building in the campus for BTEC courses such as Criminology, Health & Social Care, Information Technology and other non A-level qualifications.

Notable alumni

Sixth form college
 Caroline Aherne: actress and writer
 Peter Ash: actor
 Andrea Ashworth: writer and academic
 Afshan Azad: actress, best known for playing Padma Patil in the Harry Potter films
 Mark Collins: guitarist, The Charlatans
 Sally Lindsay: actress and comedian
 Mani: musician, Notably the Bassist for The Stone Roses and briefly Primal Scream
 Chris Ofili: artist and recipient of the Turner Prize
 Nedum Onuoha: footballer, playing for Queens Park Rangers F.C.
 Lucy Powell: (Labour MP for Manchester Central and former Shadow Secretary for Education)
 Shaun Wright-Phillips: footballer, playing for MLS team New York Red Bulls
 Wunmi Mosaku: actress

Grammar school
 Brian Bagnall: cartoonist and writer for Private Eye (Bagnall was a writer for the satirical Dear Bill letters feature) 
 Chris Buckley: footballer
 Anthony Burgess: author, poet, composer; A Clockwork Orange.
 Denis Carter, Baron Carter: politician
 James Cunningham: Bishop of Hexham and Newcastle, 1958–74
 Augustine Hailwood: Conservative MP for Manchester Ardwick, 1916–22
 Martin Hannett: record producer; co-founder of Factory Records
 Peter Hebblethwaite: journalist
 Bernard Hill: actor 
 Major Henry Kelly (VC)
 Bernard Longley: Roman Catholic Archbishop of Birmingham from 2009
 Gary Mounfield: musician, member of The Stone Roses
 Tim Willocks: doctor and novelist

See also

 Listed buildings in Manchester-M14
 List of direct grant grammar schools

References

External links
 
 Audio interview with Brother Cyril - headmaster of Xaverian College from 1962 to 1989.
 EduBase

Catholic secondary schools in the Diocese of Salford
Schools sponsored by the Xaverian Brothers
Buildings and structures in Manchester
Education in Manchester
Defunct grammar schools in England
Educational institutions established in 1862
Sixth form colleges in Greater Manchester
E
1862 establishments in England